Knipowitschia is a genus of marine, fresh and brackish water gobies native to Eurasia. The genus name almost certainly honours Nikolai Mikhailovich Knipovich (1862-1938), a biologist who led a number of expeditions to the Caspian Sea.

Species
There are currently 17 recognized species in this genus:
 Knipowitschia byblisia Ahnelt, 2011 (Byblis goby)
 Knipowitschia cameliae Nalbant & Oţel, 1995 (Danube delta dwarf goby)
 Knipowitschia caucasica (L. S. Berg, 1916) (Caucasian dwarf goby)
 Knipowitschia caunosi Ahnelt, 2011 (Caunos goby)
 Knipowitschia croatica Mrakovčić, Kerovec, Mišetić & D. Schneider, 1996 (Neretva dwarf goby)
 Knipowitschia ephesi Ahnelt, 1995
 Knipowitschia goerneri Ahnelt, 1991 (Corfu dwarf goby)
 Knipowitschia iljini L. S. Berg, 1931
 Knipowitschia longecaudata (Kessler, 1877) (Longtail dwarf goby)
 Knipowitschia mermere Ahnelt, 1995
 Knipowitschia milleri (Ahnelt & Bianco, 1990) (Acheron spring goby)
 Knipowitschia montenegrina Kovačić & Šanda, 2007
 Knipowitschia mrakovcici P. J. Miller, 2009
 Knipowitschia panizzae (Verga, 1841) (Adriatic dwarf goby)
 Knipowitschia punctatissima (Canestrini, 1864) (Italian spring goby)
 Knipowitschia radovici Kovačić, 2005 (Norin goby)
 Knipowitschia thessala (Vinciguerra, 1921) (Thessaly goby)

References

 
Gobiinae
 
Taxonomy articles created by Polbot